Chess Game is a 2014 Brazilian thriller film written and directed by Luis Antonio Pereira.

The film follows the story of a woman who is sentenced to prison because of a social security fraud involving a senator. The senator fears that she can tell the truth to the authorities, so he bribes the prison warden to prevent her from telling the truth.

Cast
Antonio Calloni as Senator Franco
Priscila Fantin as Mina
Tuca Andrada as Diretor Geraldo
Carla Marins as Beth
Salvatore Giuliano as Eugênio
Tarciana Saad as Delegada Bandeira
Wesley Aguiar as Alberto
Luana Xavier as Martona
Martha Paiva as Déia
Carla Franca as Barney
Fabiano Costa as Xavier
Fabio Nascimento as Valtinho
Erlene Melo as Nurse

References

External links
 

2014 thriller films
Brazilian thriller films
Films shot in Rio de Janeiro (city)
2014 films
2010s Portuguese-language films